Tramontana (S-74) is an built for the Spanish Navy by Bazán at Cartagena, Spain. It is in service with the Spanish Navy.

History

The submarine was launched in 1984 and commissioned in 1985. 

It was involved in a collision during naval exercises near Cartagena, in 2001 as well as the Perejil Island crisis in 2002.

It was deployed as part of the Spanish contribution to the multi-national task force enforcing the United Nations Security Council Resolution 1973 "to take all necessary measures to protect civilians under threat of attack" in Libya on March 22, 2011.

Between 19 and 23 March 2012, the submarine participated in the INSTREX-12 exercise, along with 11 other ships and the Portuguese Tridente-class submarine, Arpao.

On 24 May 2013, Pedro Argüelles, Secretary of State for Defence, declared at the Congress of Deputies that shipbuilding company Navantia would review the technical delays of the S-80 Submarine, which had previously been discarded.

Media
Part of the movie Navy SEALS was filmed aboard the submarine in November 1989.

See also 
 List of submarines of the Spanish Navy

Notes

References 
 

Agosta-class submarines of the Spanish Navy
Ships built in Cartagena, Spain
1984 ships
Submarines of Spain